The Cockpit Theatre is a fringe theatre in Marylebone, London.  Designed by Edward Mendelsohn and built in 1969–70 by the Inner London Education Authority (ILEA) as a community theatre, it is notable as London's first purpose-built Theatre in the round since the Great Fire of London. When ILEA was disbanded in 1990, ownership of the Cockpit was transferred to the London Borough of Westminster, who made it part of the newly renamed City of Westminster College.  It remains one of a handful of purpose-built theatre training venues in the capital and is still owned and operated by the City Of Westminster College.

Between 1993 and 1995 the Soho Theatre Company took up residence and relaunched itself after a period of homelessness.  During this period they premiered the works of over 35 new writers.

In January 2011, owners City of Westminster College moved into their new main building at Paddington Green which included a new theatre.   This change meant The Cockpit is no longer used for day-to-day teaching or academic office space and is now operating as a full-time theatre and training venue.

The auditorium 

The auditorium is 8.5m high and 11m2 with a retractable seating bank on all four sides.  Each bank seats 60 people and the seat cushions and backrests can be removed to create alternative playing areas.  With the upstage, left and right banks retracted, the downstage centre bank can be pulled out from the standard four rows to 10 rows, creating an end-on configuration.  The stage measures 6.6m x 8.6m in thrust setting and 6.6m x 5.9m in-the-round.
Upstage, a series of trapdoors span the width of the stage with a series or movable and replaceable panels covering them.  Under the stage is a large manually winched lift (now out of service) which can roll along the span of the traps.  Although these could be used for stage effects, original plans show this sub-stage area marked as a "chair store" and was to be used as the storage area for seats removed when reconfiguring the space.

Lighting 
There are 2 lighting gantries surrounding the space with the control box on the lower gantry, above the downstage centre seating bank. The lower gantry is 3.5m from the stage, the upper is 6.21m from the stage and each gantry has two scaffold bars for the rigging of lanterns or scenery.  The upper gantry also includes a central "T" shaped walkway, with the top edge of the T on the upstage side of the auditorium.  The T, and both gantries have 15A power outlets for plugging stage lighting into.  These sockets are connected to 3 Strand STM dimmers, providing 60 ways of dimming.  This equipment was installed when the Cockpit first opened and is still operational to date, as are many of the lanterns.

The design of the gantries allows for access to all lighting positions without the inherent dangers of a fly system or working up a ladder and the cable trunking surrounding the gantries also act as safety barriers to prevent accidental falls.

Name 
Now known as "The Cockpit", the theatre has previously had a few other names.  Initially named the "Gateforth Street Youth Arts Centre" (and referred to by variations thereof) it was soon decided that a simpler name would be more appropriate.  The name 'Cockpit' derived from the 17th century Cockpit Theatre and Cockpit-in-Court, both venues used as theatre and cockfighting rings which nicely echoed the theatre's in-the-round design.  Fortuitously, the original design of the foyer floor incorporated a roundel motif which linked nicely to the idea of a plane's cockpit.  The name "Cockpit Arts Workshop" was adopted and eventually became the "Cockpit Theatre" or simply the "Cockpit".

Youth work 
Since its inception, as the Cockpit Arts Workshop, the Cockpit has been used as a venue for working with young people.  The Cockpit Theatre Theatre in Education (TIE) company, started as a pilot project in March 1971 and was the first TIE company to exist within a Local Education Authority. By 1976 it employed six actor-teachers, a director and a stage manager and mostly presented TIE productions at the theatre, and sometimes in secondary schools.   An Opera in Education company also ran from the Cockpit Theatre presenting workshops linked to English National Opera productions which students later attended free of charge. Both companies closed when the Greater London Council was abolished in 1986. 

From the time of its handover from the Greater London Council to the City of Westminster College until 2011 it was used as a training venue for the City of Westminster College's performing arts, theatre lighting, sound engineering and media students, along with regularly visiting students from Ball State University and young people from The Prince's Trust.  The Cockpit hosts regular training opportunities in technical theatre skills such as rigging and pyrotechnics, and is popular with drama schools and youth groups.  It also hosts the National Youth Jazz Orchestra's weekend rehearsals every Saturday  and DreamArts every term-time Sunday.

Music In The Round 
Between April 1971 and November 1972, London Weekend Television recorded "Music In The Round" at the Cockpit.  Presented by Humphrey Burton, the show included performances and interviews with leading musicians across a broad range of genres.  Amongst talent showcased in the 22 episodes were the National Youth Jazz Orchestra (having already made the Cockpit their home), who were featured on 7 May 1972 and Marc Bolan on 23 April 1972.
'Jazz In The Round' is a new monthly barrier-busting jazz/contemporary music binge at The Cockpit every last Monday of the month starting on 30 January 2012. With a mixture of well known names and unknown artists it aims to bring together bands and artists from different scenes, genres, cultures and generations.

Other 

Once a month it runs an award-winning scratch nights called Theatre In The Pound.

The theatre regularly hosts events for Revolution Pro Wrestling.

References

Theatres in the City of Westminster